Below is list of newspapers published in Eswatini:

 Eswatini Observer
 Times of Swaziland

Eswatini